Salem Township is a township in Westmoreland County, Pennsylvania, United States. The population was 6,083 at the 2020 census.

History
Fairview Park, Hannastown Farm, and Slickville Historic District are listed on the National Register of Historic Places.

Geography
According to the United States Census Bureau, the township has a total area of 47.8 square miles (123.8 km2), of which 47.1 square miles (122.1 km2)  is land and 0.7 square mile (1.7 km2)  (1.40%) is water.

Demographics

At the 2000 census, 6,939 people, 2,932 households, and 1,976 families lived in the township. The population density was 147.2 people per square mile (56.8/km2). There were 3,117 housing units at an average density of 66.1/sq mi (25.5/km2). The racial makeup of the township was 97.88% White, 1.21% African American, 0.09% Native American, 0.06% Asian, 0.01% Pacific Islander, 0.04% from other races, and 0.71% from two or more races. Hispanic or Latino of any race were 0.16%.

Of the 2,932 households, 26.5% had children under 18 living with them, 55.8% were married couples living together, 7.2% had a female householder with no husband present, and 32.6% were non-families. 29.2% of households were one person, and 15.5% were one person aged 65 or older. The average household size was 2.34, and the average family size was 2.89.

The age distribution was 21.9% under 18, 4.6% from 18 to 24, 27.3% from 25 to 44, 25.7% from 45 to 64, and 20.5% 65 or older. The median age was 43 years. For every 100 females, there were 95.7 males. For every 100 females aged 18 and over, there were 91.3 males.

The median household income was $34,467, and the median family income was $39,803. Males had a median income of $35,197 versus $22,885 for females. The per capita income for the township was $18,937. About 4.7% of families and 7.7% of the population were below the poverty line, including 9.6% of those under age 18 and 5.9% of those aged 65 or over.

References

Townships in Westmoreland County, Pennsylvania
Populated places established in 1765
1765 establishments in Pennsylvania